Leonardo Martín Ferreyra (born 21 October 1991) is an Argentine professional footballer who plays as a right-back for Club Almagro.

Club career
Ferreyra began his senior career in 2009 with Primera B Nacional's Gimnasia y Esgrima. His professional debut arrived on 29 October during a goalless draw away to All Boys, which preceded the defender scoring his opening goal against Aldosivi on 6 February 2010. Over the course of his first four seasons, he participated in seventy-six matches and scored four times. On 30 June 2013, Ferreyra joined Primera División side Olimpo on a season-long loan deal. Eighteen appearances followed. He returned to Gimnasia ahead of the 2014, going on to take his tally to two hundred and fourteen appearances and eight goals.

In August 2020, after eleven senior years at Gimnasia, Ferreyra departed to sign for fellow Primera B Nacional team Instituto. In December 2021, Ferreyra signed a deal with Club Almagro.

International career
In 2011, Ferreyra was selected by the Argentina U20s for the Pan American Games. He won five caps at the tournament as they reached the final, where they lost to hosts Mexico U23s.

Career statistics
.

References

External links

1991 births
Living people
Sportspeople from Jujuy Province
Argentine footballers
Argentina youth international footballers
Argentina under-20 international footballers
Pan American Games medalists in football
Pan American Games silver medalists for Argentina
Association football defenders
Primera Nacional players
Argentine Primera División players
Gimnasia y Esgrima de Jujuy footballers
Olimpo footballers
Instituto footballers
Club Almagro players
Footballers at the 2011 Pan American Games
Medalists at the 2011 Pan American Games